Norman Iversen (15 October 1910 – 1964) was a Norwegian sailor, resistance member and communist politician.

He volunteered in the Spanish Civil War from 1937 to 1938, as saboteur. Back in Norway, he was recruited to the Bergen branch of the Wollweber League. He reorganized and led the Bergen branch of the sabotage group Saborg from 1943 to 1944. He was arrested in November 1944, and imprisoned at Veiten in Bergen until the end of the war. He chaired the Bergen chapter of Norwegian Communist Party from 1947 to 1952.

References

1910 births
1964 deaths
People from Hordaland
Norwegian sailors
Norwegian people of the Spanish Civil War
International Brigades personnel
Communist Party of Norway politicians
Politicians from Bergen
Norwegian anti-fascists
Norwegian resistance members
Norwegian prisoners and detainees
Prisoners and detainees of Germany
Norwegian torture victims